Where's Firuze? (Turkish: Neredesin Firuze?) is a 2004 Turkish comedy film directed by Ezel Akay and written by Levent Kazak based on a story of Özcan Deniz .

Plot
Hayri and Orhan, who run the Umut Müzik label, are two unsuccessful producers and when their latest artist Hamit Hayran fails, they are left heavily in debt. They pin their hopes on a singer from the Turkish community in Germany called Ferhat Can. Ferhat enthusiastically arrives in Turkey and falls in love with a model Melek who he first sees on a billboard.

Ferhat finishes recording at the studio, but they can't release his work because they can't afford the costs. They arrange for him to appear on a talk show (hosted by Çiğdem Tunç), but he is shafted for an established singer Tanju Gürsoy. He crashes onto the stage and manages to showcase his talent. A woman Firuze who watches him on TV is impressed by him and offers to help him become a star.

When Firuze doesn't show up for many days, Hayri and his men find out at the bank that she hadn't opened the account that she promised. Ferhat goes to her home, only to find out that she is mentally ill.

Hayri and his men are forced to accept a wedding assignment from their creditor Tayyar, which turns out to be between his son and Melek. When Melih and Ferhat takes the stage, Tayyar who had forbidden Melih to sing, is enraged  and orders them to be killed. As they flee Tayyar's men, a food fight begins and the wedding is crashed.

Hayri and his men are left depressed by their failures. They make a suicide pact and try to commit suicide by swallowing a large amount of pills in their house. Hayri wakes up next day. He regrets that he actually didn't swallow the pills and spit them out secretly. He looks at the bodies of his friends and starts crying. However, all of his friends wakes up one by one and they start laughing. Surprised to see his friends alive, Hayri proclaims that they have been reborn and announces a new start.

Cast
Haluk Bilginer - Hayri
Özcan Deniz - Ferhat
Demet Akbağ - Firuze
Cem Özer - Orhan
Ruhi Sarı - Seyfi
Ragıp Savaş - Melih
Şebnem Dönmez - Melek
Uğur Uludağ - İbrahim
Ata Demirer - Hamit Hayran
Janset - Pacal
Güner Özkul - Neval Hemşire
Ahu Türkpençe - Ayşen
Kemal Gökhan Gürses - Osman
Rıza Sönmez -  Kürşat
Zeynep Eronat - Sansar
Murat Akkoyunlu - Tatu
Ezel Akay - Kaveci

Guest stars/cameos
Ahmet Saraçoğlu -  Doktor
Ayşin Zeren -  Sirin
Bora Ayanoğlu -  Tayyar
Çiğdem Tunç - Herself
Hasan Uzma -  Gözlük
Erol Büyükburç - Smokin Farkut
Esin Afşar - Süreyya
Fatih Ürek - Emre Menekşe
Elfe Uluç - Süslü
Gamze Gözalan - Tumbul
Hamdi Alkan - Hoca
Semir Aslanyürek - Kahtalı Berber
Songül Ülkü - Alev
Tuncay Akça - Komik Tiyatrocu
Vural Bingöl - Kel
Derviş Zaim - Mahsun

Awards
The film won the following awards

16th Ankara Film Festival: Best Actress (Demet Akbağ), Best Screenplay (Mustafa Preşeva), Best Art Direction (Naz Erayda),  Best Cinematography
12th ÇASOD Awards: Best Actress (Demet Akbağ)
9th Sadri Alışık Awards: Best Actor (Haluk Bilginer), Best Actress (Demet Akbağ)
26th SİYAD Awards: Best Actress (Demet Akbağ), Best Cinematography (Hayk Kirakosyan)

Soundtrack album

In February 2004, a soundtrack album was issued on the Kalan Müzik label.

Track listing

References

External links

2004 films
2000s Turkish-language films
2000s musical comedy films
2004 black comedy films
Films set in Turkey
Turkish black comedy films
2004 comedy films